The 10th Vietnam Film Festival was held from November 9 to November 14, 1993, in Haiphong, Vietnam, with the slogan: "For an advanced Vietnam cinema, imbued with national identity" (Vietnamese: "Vì một nền điện ảnh Việt Nam tiên tiến, đậm đà bản sắc dân tộc").

Event 
Compared to previous festivals, the 10th Vietnam Film Festival attracts the attention of a large number of young audiences. The phenomenon of fans of artists, waiting for autographs, taking photos together has begun to spread more widely among different audiences. This is considered a "characteristic" film festival for the period of "market - commercial cinema".

There were 118 films in attendance at the Film Festival. The jury awarded only one Golden Lotus for "Vị đắng tình yêu" - A feature film that harmoniously combines artistic and commercial elements, and one Golden Lotus for the documentary "Đi tìm đồng đội". There is no Golden Lotus for animated and direct-to-video feature films.

Awards

Feature film

Direct-to-video

Documentary/Science film

Children/Animated film

References 

Vietnam Film Festival
Vietnam Film Festival
1993 in Vietnam